Viktor Vladimirovich Karman (born 8 December 1962 in Gvardeysk) is a Russian football coach and a former player.

Karman managed FC Baltika Kaliningrad in the Russian First Division.

External links
 

1962 births
People from Gvardeysk
Living people
Soviet footballers
FC Baltika Kaliningrad players
Soviet expatriate footballers
Expatriate footballers in Poland
Russian footballers
Russian football managers
FC Baltika Kaliningrad managers
Association football midfielders
Sportspeople from Kaliningrad Oblast